Cellucor is an American sports nutrition brand, specializing in dietary supplements, bodybuilding supplements, and energy drinks.

The brand is wholly owned by Nutrabolt, an independently owned sports nutrition company and headquartered in Austin, Texas. Cellucor can be found in convenience stores and many specialty, big-box, and online retailers.

History
In 2009, Cellucor launched in GNC. In 2011, Cellucor launched their first C4 pre-workout, C4 Extreme, with a "Chrome Series" premium packaging.

In 2012, Cellucor announced that it would release a number of new supplements, including a thermogenic weight loss supplement, CLK. The brand also unveiled its COR-Performance Series, which includes ingredients like branched chain amino acids, creatine, and protein. 

In 2013, Cellucor had several product launches including the re-launch of its mass building supplement M5 Extreme, called M5 Reloaded; the anabolic supplement P6 Black, a re-formulation; and Alpha Amino, designed to fight muscle breakdown during recovery. 

In late 2014, Cellucor launched the fourth-generation "G4 Series" with tweaked formulas of pre-workouts, amino acids, nitric oxide boosters, ready-to-drink beverages, testosterone boosters, and weight loss supplements. The product list included C4 Original, Alpha Amino, NO3, P6, and SuperHD. At the same time, the brand launched C4 Mass, C4 Ripped, C4 50x, and C4 RTD.

In the next few years, the C4 line expanded into Costco, Target, and Walmart, with NSF certified products.

In 2016, Cellucor launched C4 Ultimate, part of a lineup called the C4 iD Series. It launched its first carbonated pre-workout energy drink in 2018, called C4 On The Go Carbonated.

In 2021, Cellucor partnered with Mars Incorporated to bring flavors based on Starburst and Skittles to the C4 line.

In March 2022, C4 became the official energy drink of SXSW.

Awards
 2010 – "Best New Brand" by Bodybuilding.com
 2011 – "Vendor of the Year" by GNC, and repeating in 2013, 2014, and 2015
 2012 – "Outstanding Partnership" and "Best Product Innovation" (SuperHD) by GNC
 2012 – "Fat Loss Supplement of the Year" (SuperHD) by Bodybuilding.com
 2013 – "Vendor of the Year" and "Best Product Innovation" (P6 Black) by GNC
 2013 – "Best New Product of the Year" (COR-Performance Whey), "Pre Workout of the Year" (C4 Extreme), "Fat Loss Supplement of the Year" (SuperHD) by Bodybuilding.com
 2014 – "Pre Workout of the Year" (C4 Extreme) by Bodybuilding.com
 2015 – "New Product of the Year" (C4 Ripped) by Bodybuilding.com

Sponsorships
Cellucor sponsors a number of athletes and trainers, including Demi Bagby, Scott Mathison, and Ron "Boss" Everline.

References

Dietary supplements
Sports nutrition